5-EAPB (1-(benzofuran-5-yl)-N-ethylpropan-2-amine) is a potentially entactogenic amphetamine which is structurally related to 5-MAPB and 5-APB. It might be predicted to show similar effects to these drugs in humans, but the pharmacology of 5-EAPB remains unstudied as of 2020.

5-EAPB is similar in structure to compounds such as 5-APB which are claimed to be agonists of the 5-HT2C receptor as well as a triple monoamine reuptake inhibitor, however 5-EAPB is not listed as an example in this patent, and it is not yet established to what extent the activity of 5-EAPB resembles that of 5-APB.

Legality
In the UK, all benzofurans are considered Class B drugs and are therefore illegal.

5-EAPB is listed in the Fifth Schedule of the Misuse of Drugs Act (MDA) and therefore illegal in Singapore as of May 2015.

Adverse reactions and deaths
Three people in their 30s were hospitalised after each taking approximately 500 mg of 5-EAPB, one of whom later died in hospital, whilst attending Brownstock music festival in Essex, UK on August 31, 2013.

References

Substituted amphetamines
5-Benzofuranethanamines
Designer drugs
Entactogens and empathogens